The Andorran Democratic Centre was a Christian-democratic political party in Andorra.

History
The party first contested national elections in 2005, when it ran in coalition with Century 21. The alliance received 10.7% of the vote and won two seats.

In 2005, the two parties officially merged, creating New Centre.

References

Christian democratic parties in Europe
Defunct political parties in Andorra
Political parties disestablished in 2005